Eda Rothstein Rapoport (25 December 1890 – 9 May 1968 in New York City) was a Jewish-American composer and pianist born in the Russian Empire.

Biography
Rapoport was born in Daugavpils, in the Vitebsk Governorate of the Russian Empire (present-day Latvia), into a Jewish family. She emigrated to the United States, where she married noted anesthetist Boris Rapoport (1888–1948) and lived much of her life in New York City.

Rapoport studied composition with Walter Piston, Aaron Copland and Arnold Schoenberg.  She composed several hundred works including music for piano, violin, voice and symphony orchestra. In 1943 she presented a program of her own compositions in Carnegie Chamber Music Hall (now Weill Recital Hall), and was also accompanist for her songs.

The Columbia University Department of Music sponsors the Boris and Eda Rapoport Prize in Composition.

Selected works
Several of Rapoport's compositions have been published by Transcontinental Music, White-Smith Music Publishing, Maxwell Weaner, Axelrod Publications, Associated Music Publishers, and El. Cantor Music.

Stage
 The Fisherman and His Wife, Opera-Fantasy in 1 act; libretto after the Grimm's fairy tale
 GI Joe, Opera in 1 act, 3 scenes; libretto by Boris Rapoport
 The Hobo and the Old Maid, Ballet

Orchestral
 Adagietto for strings and flute
 Adagio for string orchestra
 Israfel, Tone Picture after Edgar Allan Poe for flute, string orchestra and harp
 The Mathmid (Hamathmid), Symphonic Poem after Hayim Nahman Bialik
 Miniature Symphony
 Petite Suite for string orchestra
 Revolt in the Warsaw Ghetto, Lament for string orchestra
 Suite for orchestra
   At the Sea
   A Starry Night (after Van Gogh)
   Valse
 Symphonic Dances
 Three Pastels for string orchestra, Op. 12; original for piano solo
   A Weeping Willow
   The Boatman
   In the Garden

Concertante
 Concerto for violin and orchestra
 Concerto for piano and orchestra
 Lamentations for cello and orchestra (1933, revised 1940); original for cello and piano; dedicated to cellist Jean Bedetti

Chamber music
 Agada (Legend) for violin or cello and piano (published 1939)
 Caprice for violin alone
 Arabesque for violin and piano
 Berceuse for violin and piano
 Chant hébraïque for viola or cello and piano, Op. 13 (published 1939)
 The Clown for violin and piano
 Conga for violin and piano
 Echoes from the Forest for violin and piano
 Elegy for cello and piano
 Essay for flute and piano
 Etching for flute and piano
 Explorations for clarinet and piano
 Fantasia for saxophone and piano
 Impressions for solo flute
 Impressions for violin solo or violin and piano
 Indian Legend for flute, oboe, clarinet, horn and bassoon (published 1949)
 Invocation and Caprice for cello and piano
 Kol Nidrei for violin alone
 Lamentations Based on Hebrew Themes for cello and piano (published 1933); also for cello and orchestra
 Legend for violin alone
 Looking Through My Window for violin alone
 Meditation for violin alone
 Melodie for violin and piano
 Midrash for violin and piano (published 1939)
 Moods for cello and piano
 Moods of the Past for violin alone
 Mysterious Forest for flute and string quintet
 Mystique for flute alone
 Nigun (Melody) for violin or cello and piano (published 1939)
 Nocturne in E for violin and piano
 Pastoral Quartet
 Petite Poem for violin and piano
 [2 Pieces] for violin and piano, Op. 21 (published 1941)
   Berceuse
   Perpetuum Mobile
 Poem for viola and piano, Op. 14 (published 1939)
 Quartet in G for 2 violins, viola and cello, Op. 16 (published 1939)
 String Quartet on Hebrew Themes for 2 violins, viola and cello (published 1944)
 String Quartet in C major for 2 violins, viola and cello
 String Quartet No. 3 for 2 violins, viola and cello
 Quartet for flute, violin, cello and piano
 Quartet for violin, viola, cello and piano
 Quintet No. 1 for flute and string quartet
 Quintet No. 2 for flute and string quartet
 Rendezvous for violin and piano
 Romanze for violin and piano
 Sea Fog for violin and piano
 Sholom Aleichem Suite for violin and piano
 Sonata for cello and piano
 Sonata No. 2 for violin and piano
 Song and Dance for violin alone
 Song of the Gondolier for violin alone
 Song of the River for cello and piano
 A Study for violin alone
 Thoughts in the Night ... (Harhorëy Lailah) for violin or cello and piano (published 1946); based on a poem by Hayim Nahman Bialik; also for voice and piano
 Trio in A minor

Organ
 Capriccio (with Hammond registration) (published 1947)
 Notturno (with Hammond registration) (published 1947)
 Prelude

Piano
 The Acrobat
 Four Episodes from the Life of Moses
 The House on the Bay
 Rocks and Sea
 Silhouette
 Sonata No. 1
 Sonatina
 Sonata No. 3
 Sonatina No. 4
 Suite for 2 pianos (composed 1941)
   Out for a Stroll
   By the Sea
   Sunset
   Dance of the Fireflies
 Three Etchings
   The Old Castle
   Lake Louise
   The Grand Canyon
 Three Impressions (published 1943)
   In the Forest
   Nocturne
   The Brook
 Three Pastels, Op. 12 (published 1934); also orchestrated
   A Weeping Willow
   The Boatman
   In the Garden

Vocal
 The Angel for voice and piano
 Drinking Song for voice and piano (published 1945); words from the Russian by Harry Fein
 Five Songs for voice and piano
   A Little Madness
   Autumn Leaves
   Foolish Birds
   If Plot Is Not
   To an Air Cadet
 The Raven for voice and string quintet or string orchestra, Op. 15 (published 1939); words by Edgar Allan Poe
 The River for voice and piano (published 1945); words by Paul Eisman
 Sleep, Little Baby for voice and piano (published 1945)
 Thoughts in the Night ... (Harhorëy Lailah) for voice and piano (published 1946); words by Hayim Nahman Bialik; also for violin or cello and piano
 To a Cactus for voice and piano (published 1945); words by Laurette Pizer
 Vacation for voice and piano (published 1945); words by Boris Rapoport

References

External links
 Columbia University Libraries Archival Collections: Eda Rothstein Rapoport Papers, ca.1915–1968.

1890 births
1968 deaths
Musicians from Daugavpils
People from Dvinsky Uyezd
Latvian Jews
20th-century classical composers
American women classical composers
American classical composers
American classical pianists
American women classical pianists
Jewish American classical composers
Jewish classical musicians
Latvian composers
Latvian classical pianists
Emigrants from the Russian Empire to the United States
20th-century classical pianists
20th-century American pianists
20th-century American women pianists
20th-century American composers
20th-century women composers
20th-century American Jews